Boreohydridae is a family of cnidarians belonging to the order Anthoathecata.

Genera:
 Plotocnide Wagner, 1885
 Psammohydra Schulz, 1950

References

 
Aplanulata
Cnidarian families